American Eagle may refer to:
Bald eagle, sometimes called the American eagle, the national bird and national animal of the United States

Aviation
American Eagle (airline brand), a brand name under which several regional airlines operate flights for American Airlines on a code sharing basis
Envoy Air, formerly American Eagle Airlines now a wholly owned subsidiary of American Airlines Group
American Eagle Aircraft Corporation, an aircraft design and manufacturing company

Coins
American Eagle bullion coins, bullion coins produced by the US Mint
Eagle (United States coin), a pre-1932 circulation gold coin

Ships
American Eagle (schooner), a historic schooner and U.S. National Historic Landmark
American Eagle (2000 ship), a cruise ship known as American Eagle from 2000 to 2013
Queen of the Mississippi (2015 ship), a paddlewheel river cruise ship that entered service in 2015, originally American Eagle

Sports
American Eagles, the athletics teams representing American University
United States national rugby union team, nicknamed the Eagles
British Bulldog (game), also known as American Eagle in the U.S.

Other
Bald eagle, sometimes called the American eagle, the national bird and national animal of the US
American Eagle (ammunition brand)
American Eagle Outfitters, a U.S. clothing retailer
AMC Eagle, a car also known as American Eagle
American Eagle (comics), several characters in comics named American Eagle
American Eagle (roller coaster), a racing wooden roller coaster at Six Flags Great America in Gurnee, Illinois
North American Eagle, a jet-powered automobile vying for a speed record
Salem Gazette, a US newspaper briefly published as The American Eagle